The Netherlands national cricket team toured New Zealand in December 1992 and played eight matches against teams representing various regions of New Zealand. The Dutch team was captained by Steven Lubbers.

Matches

The second game of the tour was against the Auckland Second XI at Melville Park, Auckland on 6 December 1992. The Auckland Second XI won by 7 wickets. On a damp, low bouncing, pitch the Dutch team were sent in to bat. Scoring was low with Rupert Gomes scoring 18 and Peter Cantrell adding 16. Blair Hendren, a 19-year old medium pacer, took 6 wickets for 14 runs (4 of which were wides) off 10 overs, including 5 maidens. Matthew O'Rourke supported taking 2 wickets for 25 runs. Auckland second XI took their time with their run chase, batting for longer than the Dutch team had, before reaching their target for the loss of only 3 wickets. Martin Pringle top scored with 18 not out, B. Chiplin 17 and Andrew Reinholds scored 15.

References

1992 in Dutch cricket
1992 in New Zealand cricket
Dutch cricket tours abroad
New Zealand cricket seasons from 1970–71 to 1999–2000